Morinamide (or morphazinamide, or morinamid) is a drug used in the treatment of tuberculosis. It behaves as a prodrug for Pyrazinamide.

References 

Pyrazines
4-Morpholinyl compunds
Carboxamides
Anti-tuberculosis drugs